For Life is the debut studio album by American indie-pop band Phases, after their first, Suicide Pact, was released under their old name of JJAMZ in 2012.

The single "I'm In Love with My Life" was used in an ad for The Honest Company.

Background
Lead singer Z Berg told Entertainment Weekly, "The time before we started making this music was kind of uncertain, and we had been playing music together as JJAMZ for years and years. As much as I love that record and that music, there was no real concept or direction for it. When it came time to think about how we move forward, we didn’t have the foundational structure to know where to go next." In a separate interview for Nylon she explained, "None of us were in a great place. I wanted to move out of L.A., and I didn't know if we were going to play music together. Then this music really brought us back together and strengthened our friendship and our excitement as a band." Berg told Artistdirect that the band's new sound came about from co-producer Alex Greenwald making recordings in his house: "He sort of sequestered himself in his house ... and learned how to record music. He recorded on Garage Band and an outdated version at that. He just became this electronic recording wizard. That's where we started." When Berg heard Greenwald's experimental recordings, "It sounded like weird, future spaceship music, from a very old spaceship. I thought, 'Alright, whatever happens, let’s at least work on this and make songs for fun, without thinking where they go or who they’re for.'" The group then wrote and jammed in Greenwald's home, silently projecting visually interesting films like Tron and Total Recall on the walls for inspiration.

Critical reception

Neil Z. Yeung of Allmusic wrote, "Even though this is their second release as a band, Phases' debut sounds little like JJAMZ. For Life brings the dingy club rock show into the nightclub, with groove and a smile." Dave Medsker of Popdose referred to "I'm In Love With My Life" as "a catchy song," and said the album was "loaded with songs just as good or better." He said the album's biggest drawback was "that it sounds like they had maybe two keyboards and one drum machine to make the entire album. When one listens to the number of keyboard and drum tracks that Chvrches dropped on their first two albums, Phases would have benefited greatly from diversifying the instrumentation. The tunes are strong, but the sameness in sound undermines them towards the end." Michael Smith at Renowned for Sound gave the album 5 out of 5 stars, writing: "It's not often that you see a band completely reinvent themselves and pull it off as flawlessly as PHASES do ... The intelligent little production choices are what make it such a strong album."

Track listing

External links

References

2015 albums
Phases (band) albums
Warner Records albums